Sylvie Datty-Ngonga Tara-Agoue (born 30 May 1988 in Begoua, Bangui) is a Central African freestyle wrestler. She competed in the freestyle 63 kg event at the 2012 Summer Olympics and was eliminated by Soronzonboldyn Battsetseg in the 1/8 finals.

References

External links
 

1988 births
Living people
Central African Republic female sport wrestlers
Olympic wrestlers of the Central African Republic
Wrestlers at the 2012 Summer Olympics
People from Bangui